REBELutionary is the seventh studio album by Massachusetts rapper Reks. It was released on July 23, 2012 by Gracie Productions. The album is the follow-up to Straight, No Chaser. The album was entirely produced by Numonics. It features guest appearances by Termanology, Krondon (of Strong Arm Steady), J. Nics, Jon Connor, Venessa Reece, Lucky Dice, Chi-Knox, Boycott Blues, Sene, Koncept, Knowledge Medina, DJ Heron, and Ea$y Money.

Track listing
 Intro
 Unlearn
 Hallelujah
 Bang Bang (feat. J NICS)
 Shotgun (feat. Jon Connor & Vanessa Renee)
 War Is A Racket
 Rebelutionary
 Ignorance Is Bliss (feat. Termanology)
 Passports
 Ava Rice Interlude
 Ava Rice (feat. Knowledge Medina & DJ Heron)
 The Jones' (feat. Krondon)
 The Edge (feat. Lucky Dice & Chi-Knox)
 La Luna (feat. Sene, Koncept & Vanessa Renee)
 Gepeto (Reality Is...)
 Obedient Workers
 Outro
 Shotgun (Remix) (feat. Boycott Blues & Ea$y Money)

References
 http://ughh.com/reks-w-numonics-rebelutionary/GCE010CD/
 http://www.allmusic.com/album/rebelutionary-mw0002393568

2012 albums
Reks albums